Psidium claraense is a species of plant in the family Myrtaceae. It is endemic to Cuba.  It is threatened by habitat loss.

References

Endemic flora of Cuba
claraense
Critically endangered plants
Taxonomy articles created by Polbot
Taxobox binomials not recognized by IUCN